Miroslav Popov (born 14 June, 1995 in Dvůr Králové nad Labem) is a Czech motorcycle racer.

Career statistics

Grand Prix motorcycle racing

By season

Races by year
(key)

Supersport World Championship

Races by year
(key)

External links

Living people
1995 births
Czech motorcycle racers
125cc World Championship riders
Moto3 World Championship riders
Moto2 World Championship riders
Supersport World Championship riders
FIM Superstock 1000 Cup riders